New York's 84th State Assembly district is one of the 150 districts in the New York State Assembly. It has been represented by Amanda Septimo since 2021. She succeeded Carmen Arroyo, following her removal from the ballot due to petitioning fraud.

Geography
District 84 is in the South Bronx. It includes the neighborhoods of Mott Haven, Concourse and portions of Highbridge. Yankee Stadium is located in this district.

Recent election results

2022

2020

2018

2016

2014

2012

2010

References

84